Milan Vukotić (born 5 October 2002) is a Montenegrin  professional footballer who plays as a midfielder for Zrinjski Mostar on loan from Prva HNL club Dinamo Zagreb.

Club career

Budućnost Podgorica

He started his career with Budućnost Podgorica.

Iskra Danilovgrad

In 2019, he signed for Iskra Danilovgrad.

Dinamo Zagreb

In 2020, he signed for Dinamo Zagreb.

In July 2022, Vukotić was promoted to the first team of Dinamo Zagreb. Vukotić has not yet appeared in a single game for the team from Zagreb.

Loan to Tabor Sežana and Zrinjski Mostar
In August 2022, Vukotić was sent on loan until the end of the half-season to the Slovenian Tabor Sežana. In January 2023, it was confirmed that Vukotić was sent on a new loan, this time to a Bosnian club Zrinjski Mostar.

International career
Vukotić is a member of the Montenegro national under-21 team. He has also represented Montenegro at all youth levels.

Career statistics

Club

Honours
Budućnost Podgorica
1.CFL: 2020–21

References

External links
Milan Vukotić at Sofascore

2002 births
Living people
Footballers from Podgorica
Montenegrin footballers
Montenegro youth international footballers
Montenegro under-21 international footballers
Association football midfielders
HŠK Zrinjski Mostar players
Premier League of Bosnia and Herzegovina players